"My Boy Jack" is a 1916 poem by Rudyard Kipling. Kipling wrote it for Jack Cornwell, the 16 year old youngest recipient of the Victoria Cross who stayed by his post on board the light cruiser HMS Chester at the Battle of Jutland until he died. Kipling's son John was never referred to as "Jack". The poem echoes the grief of all parents who lost sons in the First World War. John Kipling was a 2nd Lt in the Irish Guards and disappeared in September 1915 during the Battle of Loos in the First World War. The poem was published as a prelude to a story in his book Sea Warfare written about the Battle of Jutland in 1916. The imagery and theme is maritime in nature and as such it is about a generic nautical Jack (or Jack Tar), though emotionally affected by the death of Kipling's son.

Text of the poem
{{poemquote|
"Have you news of my boy Jack?”
    Not this tide.
"When d'you think that he'll come back?"
    Not with this wind blowing, and this tide.

"Has any one else had word of him?"
    Not this tide.For what is sunk will hardly swim,    Not with this wind blowing, and this tide."Oh, dear, what comfort can I find?"
    None this tide,
    Nor any tide,
Except he did not shame his kind—
    Not even with that wind blowing, and that tide.Then hold your head up all the more,    This tide,    And every tide;Because he was the son you bore,    And gave to that wind blowing and that tide!}}

Dramatisation
My Boy Jack is the name of a 1997 play written by English actor David Haig. It examines how grief affected Rudyard Kipling and his family following the death of his son, John (known as Jack; although see the main Wikipedia entry on Rudyard Kipling), at the Battle of Loos in 1915. It includes a recitation of the poem, My Boy Jack. Ben Silverstone first played Jack Kipling on stage, while Daniel Radcliffe took over the role for the ITV screen adaptation of the same name. Haig played Rudyard Kipling on both stage and screen.

Musical settings
 "Have You News of my Boy Jack?" set to music by Ina Boyle in 1916.
 "Have You News of My Boy Jack?" set to music by Edward German in 1917.
 "My Boy Jack", song for medium voice and piano by Betty Roe.
 Neofolk singer Andrew King recorded a song showcasing the lyrics to this poem.
 Setting for voice and concertina by Peter Bellamy. Bellamy's version was also set to a three part harmony by the English folk group "Lady Maisery" on their 2011 début album Weave and Spin, and was recorded by accapella group "Hex" on their 2014 CD Husk and Bark''.

See also

 1915 in poetry

References

External links
My Boy Jack

Poetry by Rudyard Kipling
World War I poems
1915 poems